Simon Meehan (born 20 September 1961) is a former Australian rules footballer who played with St Kilda in the Victorian Football League (VFL).

A rover, Meehan was recruited locally, from St Kilda CBC. He played 55 league games for St Kilda and kicked 69 goals, from 1980 to 1984.

Meehan then played with West Torrens in the South Australian National Football League, before going to Victorian Football Association club Frankston.

He coached Old Haileyburians to two Victorian Amateur Football Association premierships, in 1989 (C Grade) and 1990 (B Grade).

In the 1993 Ovens & Murray Football League season, Meehan was coach of the Wodonga Raiders.

References

1961 births
Australian rules footballers from Victoria (Australia)
St Kilda Football Club players
West Torrens Football Club players
Frankston Football Club players
Wodonga Raiders Football Club players
Wodonga Raiders Football Club coaches
Old Haileyburians Amateur Football Club players
Living people